Imja Tse, better known as Island Peak, is a mountain in Sagarmatha National Park of the Himalayas of eastern Nepal. The peak was named Island Peak in 1953 by members of the British Mount Everest expedition because it appears as an island in a sea of ice when viewed from Dingboche. The peak was later renamed in 1983 to Imja Tse but Island Peak remains the popular choice. The peak is actually an extension of the ridge coming down off the south end of Lhotse Shar.

The southwest summit of Imja Tse was first climbed in 1953 as part of a training exercise by a British expedition that went on to summit Mount Everest. The team who climbed Imja Tse comprised Tenzing Norgay, Charles Evans, Alfred Gregory, Charles Wylie and seven other Sherpas. The main summit was first climbed in 1956 by Hans-Rudolf Von Gunten and two unknown Sherpas, members of a Swiss team that went on to make the second ascent of Everest and first ascent of Lhotse.

Climbing route 

However, adequate water supply and concerns about sleeping at a higher altitude may dictate starting from base camp. Base camp to high camp is basically a hike but just above high camp, some rocky steps require moderate scrambling and up through a broad open gully. At the top of the gully, glacier travel begins and proceeds up to a steep snow and ice slope. The climb to the summit is somewhat difficult due to steep climbing.

Headwall crevasse 
A substantial crevasse along most of the headwall leading to the summit ridge has sometimes caused teams to turn back. In April 2009, the Nepal Mountaineering Association tasked the Nepal Mountaineering Instructors' Association with installing stairs (ladders) at the crevasse. As of the 2016 fall climbing season, a 5-meter high fixed aluminum ladder is being used to cross the crevasse.

See also
Imja Glacier
Imja Tsho

References

External links

Mountains of Koshi Province
Six-thousanders of the Himalayas